Luke Bates (1873 – January 1943) was a British trade union leader.

Born in Blackburn, Bates became a weaver, then won election as secretary of the Skipton and District Weavers' and Winders' Association.  In 1913, he was instead appointed as secretary of the larger Blackburn and District Weavers', Winders' and Warpers' Association.  In 1919, he additionally became secretary of the Northern Counties Textile Trades Federation.  Through these roles, he took part in all the main labour negotiations in the cotton industry.  He was known for his diplomacy, and his wideranging knowledge of the industry.

Bates joined the Labour Party, for which he was elected to Blackburn Town Council.  From 1929 to 1931, he served as the first Labour Party Mayor of Blackburn.  He also became a magistrate.

Bates died early in 1943, still holding his trade union posts, and also served as an alderman in Blackburn.

References

1873 births
1943 deaths
English trade unionists
Labour Party (UK) councillors
Mayors of places in Lancashire
People from Blackburn